Consort Zhou (周貴人, personal name unknown) (died  363) was a Chinese imperial consort during Jin Dynasty (266–420).  She was a concubine of Emperor Cheng. She was favored by him, and she bore him his only two sons – Sima Pi (later Emperor Ai) and Sima Yi (later Emperor Fei).  After Emperor Ai became emperor in 362, succeeding his cousin Emperor Mu, he honored her with the title "Consort Dowager" (皇太妃), but never honored her as empress dowager (as that position was held by Emperor Mu's mother Empress Dowager Chu).  She died in 363 and was buried with great honors, but not with honors of an empress, as she was never one.

References 

Jin dynasty (266–420) imperial consorts
363 deaths
Year of birth unknown
4th-century Chinese women